The NAIA Men's Cross Country Championship is the annual cross country meet to determine the national champions of NAIA men's cross country running. It has been held annually since 1956. A team and individual championship are contested each year.

The most successful program has been Adams State, with 12 national titles. Oklahoma City has the most titles (5) of active NAIA programs.

The current champions are Dordt, who won their first national title in 2021.

Results

Champions

Team titles

See also
NAIA Women's Cross Country Championship
NCAA Men's Cross Country Championships (Division I, Division II, Division III)
NCAA Women's Cross Country Championships (Division I, Division II, Division III)

References

External links
NAIA Web site

College cross country in the United States
Cross country running competitions
Cross country